Yang Se-hyung (born August 18, 1985), is a South Korean comedian and entertainer. He is most known for his work on the tvN sketch comedy show Comedy Big League and MBC's Infinite Challenge. His younger brother, Yang Se-chan, is also a comedian.

Career

Yang Se-hyung began his entertainment career as a comedian in 2003, as a part of the 7th comedian admission class at SBS which also included comedian Kim Shin-young. In 2005, he made his debut on SBS's People Looking for A Laugh.

Controversies
In November 2013, Yang Se-hyung and several other celebrities, including Tak Jae-hoon, Andy Lee and Lee Soo-geun were prosecuted for partaking in illegal gambling. The Seoul Central District Court classified Yang Se-hyung's case as a general gambling crime, and he was fined 3 million won. Following his legal issues, the comedian halted his entertainment activities to self-reflect.

Filmography

Films

Television series

Variety shows

Current programs

Former programs

Web shows

Radio host

Discography

Advertising 
2017 NEXON - TalesRunner R 
2017  Lotte Chilsung Beverage - Chilsung Strong Cider 5.0 
2017  Lotte Confectionery - Bugles 
2017  Tomato Class 
2017  Goobne Chicken - Volcano Chicken 
2017  Samsung Pay - Yang Se-hyung and Hong Jin-kyung's Samsung Pay Shopping 
2017  Dong Kook Pharm - Madecassol Care 
2016  TMON - Happy BaliBali 
2016  Tomato TOEIC (2016)
2016  Samsung Card - Holgabun Night Market 2016 
2016  Hatherine Elizabeth - Spot Care
2016  King of Kings - Online Games 
2016  TOOMICS - Webtoon 
2016  Kellogg's - Chocolate Chex 
2016  Heineken - Desperados 
2016  KIA - The New K3 
2016  Mr. Pizza
2012  DaiShin Securities 
Legendz

Awards

External links 

 Yang Se-hyung fan cafe (Yang Se-hyung Leeds Update 양세형 리즈갱신)

References

1985 births
Infinite Challenge members
Living people
People from Dongducheon
People from Gyeonggi Province
South Korean comedians
Best Variety Performer Male Paeksang Arts Award (television) winners